Craig Miller may refer to:

Craig Miller (CEO), American political candidate and former CEO
Craig Miller (cricketer) (born 1971), English cricketer for Suffolk
Craig A. Miller (born 1962), Australian professional tennis player
Craig D. Miller (born 1963), American college and professional tennis player
Craig Miller (water polo) (born 1971), Australian water polo player
Craig Miller (runner)  (born 1987), American runner
Craig Miller (writer) (born 1954), American writer and film producer
Craig Miller (broadcaster) (born 1965), American radio broadcaster
Craig Miller (wrestler) (born 1985), New Zealand wrestler
Craig Miller (American football) (born 1977), American football player

See also
Craig Millar (disambiguation)